The Woods is a serialized graphic novel written by James Tynion IV, with art by Michael Dialynas. In the story, more than 500 students, faculty, and staff from a Midwestern preparatory school vanish from Earth, and reappear on the forested moon of a planet in another star system.

The Woods was published by Boom! Studios in 36 issues, from May 2014 to October 2017. Distributors bought every copy of the first issue the day it was made available for wholesale purchase; Boom Studios! issued a second printing with a slightly different cover design. The entire series was later anthologized in nine volumes, which Boom! Studios published from September 2014 to March 2018.

Honours for The Woods include "Best Graphic Novel for Young Adults" (2016) and the GLAAD Media Award for Outstanding Comic Book (2017).

Plot
The story begins at a college-preparatory school in the suburbs of Milwaukee, Wisconsin, a city in the Midwestern United States. From there, 513 people—including 437 students, 52 teachers, and 24 staff—disappear on the date October 16, 2013. They reappear on a forest-covered moon in an uncharted part of the universe.

The story follows seven students in particular: Isaac Andrews, Karen Jacobs, Calder McCready, Sanami Ota, Maria Ramirez, Adrian Roth, and Benjamin Stone.

Illustration
After James Tynion wrote The Woods, Boom Studios helped to find an artist to draw the comic. "We were looking at a bunch of people, but when I saw Michael [Dialynas]' character work, it made me see… the characters in my head, and they had come to life in a way that was wholly them, and in that moment, it was a no brainer," Tynion said. Among Dialynas' previous illustration credits are Amala's Blade (Dark Horse Comics, 2012), Trinkets: An Attic Full of Stories (Comicdom Press, 2011), and Swan Songs: Fleeting Feathers (Comicdom Press, 2010).

Collected editions 
The series was originally published in nine volumes that cover the three years the characters are on the forested moon.

The nine volumes were also collected into three "Yearbook" editions.

Reception
In 2016, the Young Adult Library Services Association named The Woods the "Best Graphic Novel for Young Adults" of the year. In 2017, GLAAD awarded Tynion the GLAAD Media Award for Outstanding Comic Book for his work on The Woods. The Woods was renominated in 2018; that year, it was one of three Tynion stories to be nominated.

Television adaptation
In December 2016, US television channel Syfy was announced to have begun developing a series based on the comic, but the project stalled. The screen adaptation was written by Michael Armbruster, with episodes set to be produced and directed by Brad Peyton.

References

External links
 

2014 comics debuts
American graphic novels
Boom! Studios titles
Comics about extraterrestrial life
Comics set in the 2010s
GLAAD Media Award for Outstanding Comic Book winners
Isekai comics
Science fiction graphic novels
Works set on fictional moons